The Güell is a river in Catalonia, Spain.

Rivers of Spain
Rivers of Catalonia